Raja Vikramarka is a 1990 Indian Telugu-language film directed by Ravi Raja Pinisetty, starring Chiranjeevi, Raadhika and Amala. The film is inspired by the 1988 American film Coming to America. It was dubbed in Tamil as Sathiyama Naan Kavalkaran and in Hindi as Daulat Ki Duniya.

Plot 
Raja Vikramarka is the prince of Skanda Dweepam, a small kingdom. As he is a prince, he is not allowed to live his own free life. His father Raja Bhupathi arranges his marriage with another kingdom's princess. She turns out to be nothing more than a sycophant, one without a brain or spine of her own. Vikramarka leaves the kingdom along with his trusted friend, Jockie, to live his own life. In the modern big city, he finds a friend and works as a mechanic, during which time he saves a woman Rekha from two attempts on her life. Her uncle Vishwanatham hires him as her bodyguard. Vishwanatham later reveals to him that he was in fact the assassin trying to kill her for her money. To thwart his plot, Vikramarka agrees to handle the murder attempts, while at the same time trying to save her. After being thrown out of the house, Vishwanatham, along with his allies Kanaka Rao and Raja Kotappa join forces to kill Vikramarka and his parents. Vikramarka saves the day and rules as king of his land.

Cast 

 Chiranjeevi as Raja Vikramarka, a prince
 Raadhika as Maya
 Amala as Rekha
 Rao Gopal Rao as Vishwanatham, Rekha's uncle and an assassin
 Kaikala Satyanarayana as Raja Bhupathi
 Kota Srinivasa Rao as Raja Kotappa
 Allu Rama Lingaiah as Joginatham
 Brahmanandam as Janaki / Jockey
 Gollapudi Maruti Rao as Kanaka Rao
 Sudhakar as Kireeti
 King Kong as Tarjan
 K. R. Vijaya as Queen
 Annapurna as Savitri
 Sri Lakshmi as Mangala
 Srilatha
 Sandhya
 Narayana Rao as Ganapathi
 Hari Prasad as Hari
 Prasad Babu as Thangavelu
 Manik Irani
 Arun Kumar
 Vijay Kumar
 Jaggarao
 Ashok Kumar
 Anjaneyulu
 Nalinikanth
 Seshagiri Rao
 Madhava Rao

Soundtrack 

The soundtrack was composed by the duo Raj–Koti. It is their 100th as composers. The album consists of six songs. Lyrics for  all songs were penned by Veturi.

References

External links 
 

1990 films
1990s Telugu-language films
Films directed by Ravi Raja Pinisetty
Films scored by Raj–Koti
Indian remakes of American films